Events from the year 1589 in art.

Events
Painter, sculptor and architect Willem Boy takes a leading role in the construction of the fortifications at Vaxholm, Sweden.

Paintings

Anonymous - Portrait of Sir Christopher Hatton
Annibale Carracci - Two Children Teasing a Cat (approximate date)
 Hieronimo Custodis
Elizabeth Brydges
Giles Brydges, 3rd Baron Chandos
Cornelis van Haarlem - The First Family (approximate date)
Lavinia Fontana - Holy Family (El Escorial)
Quentin Matsys - Vision of the Prophet Ezekiel (approximate date)
Kaspar Memberger
Virgin and Child
Wolf-Dietrich von Raitenau, prince-archbishop of Salzburg
Tintoretto - Portrait of Nicolaus Padavinus
Jacopo Zucchi - Amor and Psyche

Births
July 16 - Sinibaldo Scorza, Italian painter, draughtsman and etcher (died 1631)
August 12 - Domenico Fiasella, Italian painter of primarily frescoes (died 1669)
date unknown
Johannes van der Beeck, Dutch painter (died 1644)
Adriaen van de Venne, Dutch Baroque painter of allegories, genre subjects and portraits (died 1662)
Giovanni Francesco Guerrieri - Italian painter and Caravaggisti (died 1655)
Kanō Sansetsu, Japanese painter (died 1651)
Bernardino Capitelli, Italian painter and etcher of the Baroque period (died 1639)
probable
Domenico Fetti, Italian painter (died 1624)
Sebastian Furck, German engraver (died 1666)
Hercules Seghers, Dutch painter and printmaker of the Dutch Golden Age (died 1638)

Deaths
date unknown
Quentin Metsys the Younger, Flemish painter (born 1543)
Cornelis Molenaer, Flemish painter (born 1540)
Heo Nanseolheon, Korean poet and painter (born 1563)
Sesson Shukei, Japanese Zen monk and painter of the Muromachi period (born 1504)
probable - Bernard Palissy, French potter and craftsman (born 1510)

 
Years of the 16th century in art